Zeynalli is a surname. It may refer to:

Elkhan Zeynalli, also known by his stage name Qaraqan, Azerbaijani songwriter, musician, writer
Gulay Zeynalli (born 1988), Azerbaijani singer
Orkhan Zeynalli (born 1989), Azerbaijani rapper, part of H.O.S.T., producer, musician, and a screenwriter

See also
Cinli Zeynallı, village in the Goranboy Rayon of Azerbaijan